Igor Vladimirovich Lebedenko (born 27 May 1983) is a Russian footballer who plays as a midfielder for FC Torpedo Moscow.

Career

Club
He played for FC Lokomotiv Moscow (2005–2006) before joining FC Saturn Moscow Oblast, before that he played at FC Torpedo Moscow (2002–2004), making his Russian Premier League debut for Torpedo on 17 March 2002 in a game against FC Dynamo Moscow. On 19 February 2009 the forward has left FC Rubin Kazan to join FC Rostov.

On 5 March 2023, Lebedenko scored an equalizer for FC Torpedo Moscow in a 2–2 draw against FC Krasnodar and became the oldest goal scorer in the history of the Russian Premier League at the age of 39 years, 9 months and 6 days.

International
Igor has been called up to the Russia national football team but has not played. He has played for the Russia U-21.

Honours
Rubin Kazan
 Russian Cup : 2012

Torpedo Moscow
 Russian Football National League : 2021-22

Career statistics

Club

Notes

References

External links
 Profile
 Profile by Football National League

1983 births
Footballers from Moscow
Living people
Russian footballers
Russia under-21 international footballers
Association football forwards
Association football midfielders
FC Torpedo-2 players
FC Torpedo Moscow players
FC Lokomotiv Moscow players
FC Saturn Ramenskoye players
FC Rostov players
FC Rubin Kazan players
FC Akhmat Grozny players
FC Ararat Moscow players
FC Fakel Voronezh players
Russian Second League players
Russian Premier League players
Russian First League players